Golden Glades is a Tri-Rail commuter rail station in Miami-Dade County, Florida, just west of the Golden Glades Interchange. This station is located at the confluence of US 441 and State Road 9. It opened to service January 9, 1989, and is the northernmost Tri-Rail station in Miami-Dade County. Golden Glades provides intercity bus service via Greyhound Lines at the station.

Layout
The station has an island platform and side platform, both of which are only accessible via an elevated walkway over State Route 9 to reach parking and buses.

External links
South Florida Regional Transportation Authority – Golden Glades station
 Station from Google Maps Street View

Tri-Rail stations in Miami-Dade County, Florida
Railway stations in the United States opened in 1989
1989 establishments in Florida